Adliswil is a town and a municipality in the district of Horgen in the canton of Zürich in Switzerland.

The official language of Adliswil is (the Swiss variety of Standard) German, but the main spoken language is the local variant of the Alemannic Swiss German dialect.

History

Adliswil is first mentioned in 1050 as Adelenswile. In the second half of the 12th Century it was mentioned as Adololdiswile and in 1248 as Adeloswile.

Under the Helvetic Republic, the hamlet of Buchenegg was transferred to the municipality of Stallikon. In 1893 the town sections of Oberleimbach and Sood were added to Adliswil.

Geography
Of this area, 23.4% is used for agricultural purposes, while 32.1% is forested. Of the rest of the land, 42.9% is settled (buildings or roads) and the remainder (1.7%) is non-productive (rivers, glaciers or mountains).  housing and buildings made up 32.6% of the total area, while transportation infrastructure made up the rest (10.4%). Of the total unproductive area, water (streams and lakes) made up 1.7% of the area.  38.3% of the total municipal area was undergoing some type of construction.

It is located in the region of Zimmerberg, within the valley of the river Sihl to the south of the city of Zürich, next to the localities of Kilchberg, Rüschlikon, Langnau am Albis and on the other hand Stallikon pertaining this to the district of Affoltern.

Demographics
Of the population in 2008 a total of 26.7% were foreign nationals.  the gender distribution of the population was 49.6% male and 50.4% female. Over the last 10 years the population has grown at a rate of 4%. Most of the population speaks German (80.9%), with Italian being second most common ( 4.9%) and English being third ( 2.5%).

In the 2007 election the most popular party was the SVP which received 36.2% of the vote. The next three most popular parties were the SPS (21.4%), the FDP (13.4%) and the CVP (9.9%).

The age distribution of the population is children and teenagers (0–19 years old) make up 20.2% of the population, while adults (20–64 years old) make up 64.5% and seniors (over 64 years old) make up 15.4%. In Adliswil about 75.5% of the population (between age 25-64) have completed either non-mandatory upper secondary education or additional higher education (either university or a Fachhochschule). There are 7,573 households in Adliswil.

Adliswil has an unemployment rate of 2.72%. , there were 57 people employed in the primary economic sector and about 9 businesses involved in this sector. 832 people are employed in the secondary sector and there are 118 businesses in this sector. 4,049 people are employed in the tertiary sector, with 543 businesses in this sector.  55.6% of the working population were employed full-time, and 44.4% were employed part-time.

The historical population is given in the following table:

 18 households in the villages of Adliswil, Oberleimbach and Rufers.
 of the 315 inhabitants, 156 lived in individual, scattered homes, not in the village.

Religion 

 there were 5,275 Catholics and 4,999 Protestants in Adliswil. From the 2000 census, 38.6% were some type of Protestant, with 36.2% belonging to the Swiss Reformed Church and 2.4% belonging to other Protestant churches. 35.5% of the population were Catholic. Of the rest of the population, 5% were Muslim, 7.8% belonged to another religion (not listed), 3.8% did not give a religion, and 13.2% were atheist or agnostic. The Sri Sivasubramaniar Temple is situated in the Sihl Valley .

Education

Public schools

The public schools (primary and lower secondary school) are supervised by the commune's school board. The board consists of nine elected members.

Private, publicly subsidized schools

Other private schools
The Zurich International School (ZIS), an international school with an international curriculum, has its upper school (senior high school) campus in Adliswil. As a private school which has instruction primarily in a foreign language (English), ZIS is approved up to compulsory school age by the canton. The whole ZIS program, for students aged 3 to 18, is accredited by the Commission on International Education and the International Baccalaureate Organisation accredits the IB Diploma at ZIS.

Transportation 
Adliswil is the only town in the canton of Zürich to pride itself on having a cable car (Felseneggbahn), which connects the town to Felsenegg on the edge of the town. Adliswil railway station is a stop on the S-Bahn Zürich's S4 line, which is a 15-minute ride from Zürich Hauptbahnhof. There is an intermediate station at Sood-Oberleimbach which is also located in the municipality of Adliswil. The Zimmerberg bus line (Zimmerbergbus), provided by the Sihltal Zürich Uetliberg Bahn (SZU), connects the Zimmerberg region and parts of the Sihl valley. The ZVV bus lines 184 and 185 provide a connection to Zurich (Wollishofen), and the ZVV night bus services provide a connection to Zürich city centre.

Notable people 
 Rudolf Günthardt (born 1936 in Adliswil) a Swiss equestrian, silver medallist at the 1960 Summer Olympics
 Rolf Fringer (born 1957 in Adliswil) an Austrian football manager, also managed the Switzerland national football team
 Bettina Bunge (born 1963 in Adliswil) a retired German tennis player
 Daniel Quaiser (born 1975 in Adliswil) a Swiss designer, musician and baritone singer 
 Izer Aliu (born 1999 in Adliswil) a Swiss football player

References

External links 

Official website 
English information

Cities in Switzerland
Municipalities of the canton of Zürich